Miguel Lerdo de Tejada (July 6, 1812 – March 22, 1861) was a Mexican statesman, a leader of the Revolution of Ayutla, and author of the Lerdo Law, extinguishing the right of corporations, including the Roman Catholic Church and indigenous communities, from holding land.<ref>D.F. Stevens, "Ley Lerdo" in Encyclopedia of Latin American History and Culture, vol. 3, p. 409.</ref>

Born in the port of Veracruz, Veracruz, both he and his younger brother, Sebastián Lerdo de Tejada, became leaders of Mexico's Liberal Party. The Church could retain only the buildings it used for its operations (churches, monasteries, seminary buildings); governments could keep only government offices, jails, and school buildings. Other property, which had been used to generate income for the Church and for local governments, was to be sold with the proceeds going into the national treasury. Because of the disruptions of the War of Reform (1858 - 1861) and the French Intervention (1862 - 1867) that wracked Mexico, few properties were actually sold as a direct result of the Ley Lerdo. Most of the "disruptions" attributed to that law actually occurred later, under legislation passed during the regime of Porfirio Díaz (1876 - 1911), but took their legal foundation in the Ley Lerdo.

Miguel Lerdo de Tejada resigned from his position as Treasury Secretary when Comonfort's successor, Benito Juárez, rejected Lerdo's proposal to suspend the payment of Mexico's foreign debt. Lerdo had attempted to negotiate foreign loans using confiscated church property as collateral to fund the liberal side of the War of the Reform, but was unsuccessful.  He returned to Mexico City with the victorious Liberal government at the conclusion of the War of the Reform on January 1, 1861, and took up his elected post as a member of the Supreme Court. He campaigned against Juárez in 1861 for the presidency, but he died of typhus on March 22, 1861.

See also
La Reforma
War of the Reform
Reform laws
Liberalism in Mexico
Sebastián Lerdo de Tejada

References

Further reading

Bazant, Jan. Alienation of Church Wealth in Mexico: Social and Economic Aspects of the Liberal Reform, 1856-1875. Cambridge University Press 1971.
Blázquez, Carmen. Miguel Lerdo de Tejada: Un liberal veracruzano en la polítical nacional. 1978.
Knowlton, Robert J. Church Property and the Mexican Reform 1856-1910. 1976.
Sinkin, Richard N. The Mexican Reform, 1855-1876: A Study in Liberal Nation-Building. 1979.
Tenenbaum, Barbara. The Politics of Penury: Debt and Taxes in Mexico 1821-1856''. Albuquerque: University of New Mexico Press 1986.

People from Veracruz (city)
1812 births
1861 deaths
Liberalism in Mexico
Mexican judges
Mexican Secretaries of Finance